Greenbrier Creek is a  long 3rd order tributary to the Rocky River that begins in Alamance County and flows to Chatham County.

Course
Greenbrier Creek rises in a pond about 1.5 miles northeast of Liberty, North Carolina in Alamance County.  Greenbrier Creek then flows south into Chatham County to join the Rocky River about 3 miles southwest of Crutchfield Crossroads, North Carolina.

Watershed
Greenbrier Creek drains  of area, receives about 47.4 in/year of precipitation, has a wetness index of 453.25 and is about 38% forested.

References

Rivers of North Carolina
Rivers of Alamance County, North Carolina
Rivers of Chatham County, North Carolina